Francis Dadzie  is a Ghanaian professional footballer who currently plays as a forward for Kerala United FC in the Kerala Premier League.

Career

Early career
In 2012, Dadzie signed for Asante Kotoko of the Ghana Premier League. He soon went on to join fellow Premier League side Bechem United FC. In January 2014, Dadzie went on trial with the Portland Timbers of Major League Soccer but failed to make it to the team.

NorthEast United
On 6 August 2015 it was announced that Dadzie would sign for NorthEast United FC of the Indian Super League. Dadzi is the Youngest Foreign Player of NorthEast United also He is the Youngest Goalscorer in NorthEast United Jersey.

Sporting clube de Goa
On 6 October 2016 it was announced that Dadzie signed for Sporting Clube de Goa of the Goa Professional League.
He has been added to the team and also made his debut in the Goa Professional League match on the same day. He had a rather memorable debut against St. Cruz Club Of Cavelossim as he scored two goals and led his team to a 2–0 victory.

Career statistics

References

Living people

Ghanaian footballers

NorthEast United FC players
Association football forwards
Ghana Premier League players
Expatriate footballers in India
Year of birth missing (living people)